Jean Adamson,  (born 29 February 1928) is a British writer and illustrator of children's books. She is best known for the Topsy and Tim books, the first of which was published in 1960 and which were relaunched in 2003.

Life and career

Adamson was born in Peckham, in southeast London. She attended grammar school until she was 16 before studying illustration at Goldsmiths College at the University of London. After graduating, she began teaching illustration and design at the University.

Adamson met her future husband and writing partner, Gareth Adamson, while studying at university. The couple married in 1957 and moved to Newcastle, where they began to work on children's books together.

The Adamsons moved to The Old Farmhouse, Padney, in Cambridgeshire in 1968.  After 25 years of marriage, Gareth died of a brain tumour in February 1982 and Jean moved to Stretham, also in Cambridgeshire.

In September 2009, Adamson was robbed by a youth while walking in Stretham. She was left with a broken arm and her shopping bag was stolen.

Awards

Adamson received an MBE in the 2000 New Year Honours for her services to children's literature and in 2016, she was made Honorary Fellow of Goldsmiths College.

References

1928 births
Living people
British children's book illustrators
English children's writers
Alumni of Goldsmiths, University of London
Members of the Order of the British Empire
English women writers
English women artists
People from Peckham
People from Stretham